National Highway 338, commonly referred to as NH 338 is a national highway in India. It is a secondary route of National Highway 38.  NH-338 runs in the state of Tamil Nadu in India.

Route 
NH338 connects Melur and Tiruppathur in the state of Tamil Nadu.

Junctions  
 
  Terminal near Melur.
  Terminal near Tiruppathur.

See also 
 List of National Highways in India
 List of National Highways in India by state

References

External links 

 NH 338 on OpenStreetMap

National highways in India
National Highways in Tamil Nadu